The Union of Utrecht of the Old Catholic Churches, most commonly referred to by the short form Union of Utrecht, is a federation of Old Catholic churches, nationally organized from schisms which rejected Roman Catholic doctrines of the First Vatican Council in 1870; its member churches are not in communion with the Roman Catholic Church.

The 1889 Declaration of Utrecht is one of three founding documents together called the Convention of Utrecht. Many provinces of the Union of Utrecht of the Old Catholic Churches are members of the World Council of Churches. The  is in full communion with the Evangelical Lutheran Church of Sweden, the Anglican Communion through the 1931 Bonn Agreement; and, with the Philippine Independent Church, the Spanish Reformed Episcopal Church, and the Lusitanian Catholic Apostolic Evangelical Church through a 1965 extension of the Bonn Agreement.

 the  includes six member churches: the Old Catholic Church of the Netherlands (OKKN), the Catholic Diocese of the Old Catholics in Germany, the Christian Catholic Church of Switzerland, the Old Catholic Church of Austria, the Old Catholic Church of the Czech Republic, and the Polish Catholic Church in Poland.

Theology and practices
The Old Catholic churches reject the universal jurisdiction of the pope, as well as the Roman Catholic dogma of papal infallibility (1870), which was used to proclaim the Roman Catholic dogmas of the Assumption of Mary (1950). While Old Catholics affirm the Real Presence of Christ in the Eucharist, they do not emphasize transubstantiation as the sole dogmatic explanation for this presence. They maintain such basic western Catholic practices as baptism by affusion (pouring of water) and the use of unleavened bread in the Eucharist. Additionally, they have many aspects in common with the Orthodox, Lutheran and Anglican churches, such as optional clerical celibacy. The Old Catholic Church accepts the doctrines of the Christian Church prior to the Great Schism of A.D. 1054.

Leadership
Individual Union of Utrecht member churches maintain a degree of autonomy, similar to the practice of the Anglican Communion. Each diocese of the member churches has a diocesan bishop, and countries with more than one diocese have a bishop who is appointed as "bishop in charge" or a similar title. The primate ( leader) of the union is the Archbishop of Utrecht (not to be confused with the Roman Catholic Archbishop of Utrecht). From 2000 to 2020, the archbishop was Joris Vercammen, a former Roman Catholic who served on the central committee of the World Council of Churches. In 2020, Joris Vercammen was succeeded by Bernd Wallet.

History
The mother church, the Old Catholic Church of the Netherlands, was established in the 18th century as a result of tensions between the local Catholic hierarchy and the Roman Curia. The other churches, such as the Catholic Diocese of the Old Catholics in Germany, and the Christian Catholic Church of Switzerland, followed suit after the First Vatican Council, which defined the dogma of papal infallibility.

Former member churches
In former Yugoslavia, the union had three organized Old Catholic episcopal jurisdictions: Old Catholic Church of Croatia (created in 1922-1923, first bishop Marko Kalojera consecrated in 1924 in Utrecht), Old Catholic Church of Slovenia (with bishops Radovan Jošt and Anton Kovačevič), and Old Catholic Church of Serbia (with bishop Milan Dobrovoljac (1954-1966). Three churches formed "Union of Old-Catholic Churches in Yugoslavia" (1954). The Union eventually ceased to exist with break-up of Yugoslavia (1991-1992) and even before that, old-catholic bishopric in Serbia was extinguished, and same happened with bishoprics in Slovenia and Croatia. Finally, remaining old-catholic parishes in Croatia and other parts of former Yugoslavia were placed under jurisdiction of the Old Catholic Church of Austria.

The International Old Catholic Bishops' Conference stated in 1997 that the Polish National Catholic Church (PNCC) was not full communion with other Union of Utrecht churches because the PNCC did not accept the ordination of women. Since 1998, the  did not permit  bishops to participate in  episcopal consecrations. The  "refused to repudiate" a 1976  statement opposing the ordination of women and the  "indicated that any attempt to admit women to the ministerial priesthood would lead to a break in full communion with churches that adopted the practice."

The Old Catholic Church of Austria approved the blessing of same-sex unions in 1998 without  deliberation; in contrast, the  disapproved the blessing of same sex unions in 2002 and "described homosexual practice as sinful".

The Polish National Catholic Church established the Union of Scranton in 2008. No other North American body has been recognized by the IBC.

The Old Catholic Church of Slovakia was a member church of the Union of Utrecht from 2000 but it was removed from membership in 2004.

Former missions
In July 2011, the Old Catholic Church of Switzerland ended its mission to Old Catholic parishes in Italy. "In cooperation with ecumenical partner churches" the parishes were "offered a model that guarantees their continued pastoral care".

See also
 Willibrord Society

Notes

References

External links 

Union of Utrecht of the Old Catholic Churches
Religious organizations established in 1889
Christian denominations established in the 19th century
History of Utrecht (city)